The Portrait of Prince Alessandro Farnese is a painting by the 16th-century artist Sofonisba Anguissola. It depicts the prince, later the Duke of Parma and Piacenza, as 15-year old boy, dressed in refined courtly clothing. Prince Alessandro was the son of Ottavio Farnese, Duke of Parma, and the grandson of King Charles V of Spain.

The painting was purchased by the National Gallery of Ireland in 1864. At the time it was attributed to Alonso Sánchez Coello, but later study of the painting revealed it to be the work of Anguissola. The reattribution revealed this to have been the first painting by a female artist to enter the gallery's collection.

References 

Farnese, Alessandro
Collection of the National Gallery of Ireland
1560s paintings
Portraits of men